Jurong Technologies Industrial Corporation Limited was an electronics contract manufacturer based in Singapore. The company was listed on the SGX, the Singapore Stock Exchange, and it was a part of the Straits Times Index until 30 September 2010 when it was delisted.

References

External links 
Jurong Hi-Tech Home page (discontinued)
SGX rejects Jurong Tech's appeal to postpone delisting

Electronics companies of Singapore